Jimmy Docherty (5 June 1931 – 18 October 2014) was a Scotland international rugby union footballer. In his rugby career he played as a Centre.

Rugby union career

Amateur career

Docherty played for Glasgow HSFP.

Provincial career

He was selected by Glasgow District to play Australia.

International career

He was capped for  8 times between 1955 and 1958.

Docherty also played for the Barbarians.

Outside of rugby

Family

His father was a tailor but he was also a noted footballer; on the books for Glasgow Rangers, Clyde and Ayr United.

Business

After he retired from rugby he ran the family tailor business.

References

1931 births
2014 deaths
Glasgow District (rugby union) players
Glasgow HSFP players
Rugby union centres
Rugby union players from Glasgow
Scotland international rugby union players
Scottish rugby union players